Michel Moretti (born 26 May 1989) is a French professional footballer who most recently played as a midfielder for Ligue 2 club Bastia.

Career
Moretti made his professional debut with CA Bastia in Ligue 2 on 4 August 2013, in a match against Lens.

References

External links
 

Living people
1989 births
Association football midfielders
French footballers
Ligue 2 players
Championnat National players
Championnat National 3 players
SC Bastia players
CA Bastia players
AS Furiani-Agliani players